Marco Chierice (born 1580) was an Italian painter.

Biography
He was born and trained in Correggio. He mainly painted still-lives and landscapes. He painted in the parish church of Mandriolo (frazione of Correggio), and for the destroyed Casino of Count Ottavio Bolognesi. He was a painter for Duke Ferdinand Charles of Mantua.

References

1580 births
Year of death unknown
People from Correggio, Emilia-Romagna
17th-century Italian painters
Italian male painters
Italian still life painters
Painters from Mantua